= General election (disambiguation) =

A general election is a set of simultaneous elections that collectively determine the entire elected membership of a parliament.

General election may also refer to:
U.S. voting:

- General election (U.S.), periodically scheduled election to single office
- General election, biennial simultaneous elections to United States House of Representatives
